The mining industry of Zimbabwe is highly diversified, with close to 40 different minerals. The predominant minerals mined by the industry include platinum, chrome, gold,  coal, and diamonds. The country boasts the second-largest platinum deposit and high-grade chromium ores in the world, with approximately 2.8 billion tons of platinum group metals and 10 billion tons of chromium ore. The sector accounts for about 12 percent of the country’s gross domestic product (GDP).

Early development of the country was spurred by the European discovery of gold, in many cases they found evidence of previous gold mining.

Gallery

References

External links

Mining in Zimbabwe
Economy of Zimbabwe
Zimbabwe